was a town located in Nasu District, Tochigi Prefecture, Japan.

History
As of 2003, the town had an estimated population of 45,251 and a density of 758.86 persons per km². The total area was 59.63 km².

On January 1, 2005, Nishinasuno, along with the city of Kuroiso, and the town of Shiobara (also from Nasu District), was merged to create the city of Nasushiobara.

Geography
It is the located close to nasu mountains. Some of the tourist attractions close to it are hot springs, karasuka mori park, and Nasu nagahara park.

References

External links
 Nasushiobara official website 

Dissolved municipalities of Tochigi Prefecture